The Coward is a lost 1927 silent drama film produced by Robertson-Cole Pictures Corporation(aka Joseph P. Kennedy) and stars Warner Baxter and Sharon Lynn. It was directed by Al Raboch.

Cast
 Warner Baxter as Clinton Philbrook
 Sharon Lynn as Alicia Van Orden
 Freeman Wood as Leigh Morlock
 Raoul Paoli as Pierre Bechard
 Byron Douglas as Darius Philbrook
 Charlotte Stevens as Marie
 Hugh Thomas as Maitland

References

External links
 
 

1927 films
American silent feature films
Film Booking Offices of America films
Films based on short fiction
1927 drama films
Silent American drama films
American black-and-white films
Lost American films
1927 lost films
Lost drama films
1920s American films